Texas Cannonball is a studio album by the American blues musician Freddie King, released in 1972 by Shelter Records.

The first five songs were recorded at Ardent Studios in Memphis, Tennessee; the other five at Skyhill Studios in Los Angeles, California.

Artwork
This cover art is playing the guitar as Freddie King rises to the ground, and armadillos are popping out. These armadillos are symbolized by the anti-cultural mascots of Texas created by artist Jim Franklin.

Critical reception
Reviewing a 1991 reissue of Texas Cannonball, The Commercial Appeal called the album "a masterpiece," writing that it is "full of dashing solos and some of [King's] finest vocals since his heyday in the late '50s and early '60s." In 2007, the Houston Chronicle listed it among the 75 essential Texas blues albums.

Track listing

References

External links 
 

Freddie King albums
1972 albums
Shelter Records albums
Albums produced by Denny Cordell